The United Arab Emirates Basketball Association is the governing body of basketball in the United Arab Emirates. It was founded in 1976, and are headquartered in Dubai.

The United Arab Emirates Basketball Association operates the UAE national team, and the youth national teams. They organize national competitions in the United Arab Emirates, for the senior national team and also the youth national basketball teams.

The top professional league in the United Arab Emirates is the UAE National Basketball League.

See also
United Arab Emirates men's national basketball team
United Arab Emirates men's national under-18 basketball team
United Arab Emirates men's national under-17 basketball team

References

External links
Official website 
UAE FIBA profile

Basketball
Fed
Basketball governing bodies in Asia
Sports organizations established in 1976
Sport in Dubai